Gobel is a surname. Persons with this name include:

 David Gobel (born 1952), American author and entrepreneur
 George Gobel (1919-1991), American comedian
 Jason Gobel, American guitarist and engineer
 Jean-Baptiste-Joseph Gobel (1727-1794), French Roman Catholic cleric and politician of the Revolution
 Konrad Gobel (1498-1557), German metal craftsman
 Mathieu Gobel (born 1980), French sprint canoer
 Jean-Paul Gobel (born 1943), French cleric, diplomat of the Holy See

See also
Göbel (disambiguation)
Goebel (disambiguation)
Goebbels (disambiguation)
Goble (disambiguation)

Surnames from given names
Surnames